The 1979 Fischer-Grand Prix was a men's tennis tournament played on indoor hard courts at the Wiener Stadthalle in Vienna, Austria that was part of the 1979 Colgate-Palmolive Grand Prix. It was the fifth edition of the tournament and took place from 22 October until 28 October 1979. Fifth-seeded Stan Smith won his second consecutive singles title at the event.

Finals

Singles

 Stan Smith defeated  Wojciech Fibak 6–4, 6–0, 6–2
 It was Smith's 7th title of the year and the 79th of his career.

Doubles

 Bob Hewitt /  Frew McMillan defeated  Brian Gottfried /  Raúl Ramírez 6–1, 6–4
 It was Hewitt's 3rd title of the year and the 55th of his career. It was McMillan's 3rd title of the year and the 60th of his career.

References

External links
 ATP tournament profile
 ITF tournament edition details

 
Fischer-Grand Prix
Vienna Open